Toes in Tempo was a Canadian children's dance television series which aired on CBC Television in 1957 and 1958.

Premise
This ballet-based series for children featured members of the Royal Winnipeg Ballet, particularly its solo dancers Sonja Taverner and Paddy McIntyre. Excerpts from well-known ballet pieces were featured as were demonstrations of ballet techniques.

Scheduling
This half-hour series aired on Tuesdays at 5 p.m.. Its first season of ten episodes aired from 23 April to 25 June 1957 hosted by Shirley Knight. The second season aired 13 episodes on Wednesdays at 5 p.m. from 2 April to 25 June 1958 and was hosted by Benjamin Harkarvy. That season began with an episode featuring a performance of "The Emperor's Clothes".

See also
 Dancing Storybook, a 1959 CBC series featuring the Royal Winnipeg Ballet

References

CBC Television original programming
1957 Canadian television series debuts
1958 Canadian television series endings
1950s Canadian children's television series
Black-and-white Canadian television shows